The Ministry of Human Resources and Social Security of People's Republic of China is a ministry under the State Council of China which is responsible for national labor policies, standards, regulations and managing the national social security. This includes labor force management, labor relationship readjustment, social insurance management and legal construction of labor. The State Bureau of Civil Servants reports to the new ministry.

History
The ministry was created from the merger of the former Ministry of Personnel and Ministry of Labor and Social Security, announced at the 2008 National People's Congress.

Since March 17, 2008, the ministry is headed by Yin Weimin.

Responsibilities
The MOHRSS has responsibility for managing the employment market in mainland China. The ministry also oversees the China Overseas Talent Network, part of the Thousand Talents Plan, and has internal bureaus focused on technology transfer.

Due to the financial crisis of 2008 and late 2000s recession, the department has recommended companies to prevent and control large staff reduction. The agency also provides assistance to labor-intensive industries and enterprises to create more employment. MOHRSS stressed that priority be given to migrant workers, laid-off workers, poor people and graduates from universities and colleges in offering works.

List of Ministers of Human Resources and Social Security
 (Human Resources) original Ministry of Personnel

 (Social Security) original Ministry of Labor

Human Resources and Social Security (Personnel and Labor)

See also

Labor Contract Law of the People's Republic of China
Ministries of the People's Republic of China
Social welfare in China
China Accreditation Test for Translators and Interpreters

References

External links 
 Official website of the Ministry of Human Resources and Social Security 

Human Resources and Social Security
Ministries established in 2008
China
China
Social security in China